PES Modern College of Engineering, Pune, popularly known as Modern or MCOE, is a Private Engineering Institute located in Pune, Maharashtra.    The college is approved by All India Council of Technical Education(AICTE), New Delhi, Directorate of Technical Education(DTE), and Government of Maharashtra and is permanently affiliated to University of Pune, complying to all norms and standards of Engineering education. It is UGC recognized under 2(f) and 12(B) and NAAC accredited Grade "A" college. In 2019, the Institute received an NBA accreditation for 3 years. It has also been awarded as the "Best College in the Urban area" by the University of Pune in the year 2012.

Institute history
Progressive Education Society's Modern College of Engineering(also known as MCOE) is located in Pune, Maharashtra. It was established in the year 1999. It is approved by the All India Council of Technical Education (AICTE), Directorate of Technical Education (DTE) and is affiliated to Savitribai Phule Pune University. It is recognised by the University Grants Commission (UGC) and accredited by NAAC with a Grade “A”. The college offers undergraduate programmes in eight disciplines of Engineering and various postgraduate programmes.

The college is also awarded as the "Best College in the Urban Area" by the Savitribai Phule Pune University. The campus is spread over 12 acre of land with a high-speed Wi-Fi connection. The institute has four recognised research centres affiliated to the university. It has state-of-the-art infrastructure which includes spacious classrooms, well-equipped laboratories, computer centres, language laboratory, audio-video laboratory and central library, seminar hall, auditorium, etc. The institute also has sports and gymnasium facility for both boys and girls.

Academics

Courses Offered for Under Graduation Program 

Mechanical Engineering

Computer Engineering

Electrical Engineering

Electronics and Telecommunication Engineering

Information Technology 

Artificial Intelligence and Data Science Engineering

Artificial Intelligence and Machine Learning Engineering

Electronics and Computer Engineering

Courses Offered for Post Graduation Program 
Electrical Engineering (Control Systems)

Computer Engineering (Computer Engg)

Electronics and Telecommunication Engineering (Signal Processing)

Mechanical Engineering (Heat Power)

Master of Business Administration (MBA)

Master of Computer Application (MCA)

See also

University of Pune
List of educational institutions in Pune
All India Council for Technical Education

References

Universities and colleges in Pune
Engineering colleges in Pune
Educational institutions established in 1999
1999 establishments in Maharashtra
Colleges affiliated to Savitribai Phule Pune University